The 1980 Giro del Trentino was the fourth edition of the Tour of the Alps cycle race and was held on 7 May to 10 May 1980. The race started and finished in Arco. The race was won by Francesco Moser.

General classification

References

1980
1980 in road cycling
1980 in Italian sport